Oregon is a city and county seat of Holt County, Missouri, United States. The population was 837 at the 2020 census.

History
Oregon was originally called Finley, and under that name was platted in 1841. The present name refers to the Oregon Country, which was at the time considered a prime destination of pioneer emigrants passing through the area. A post office called Oregon has been in operation since 1843.

Geography
Oregon is located at  (39.986632, -95.142501).

Demographics

2010 census
As of the census of 2010, there were 857 people, 356 households, and 235 families living in the city. The racial makeup of the city was 98.4% White, 0.5% Native American, 0.5% Asian, and 0.7% from two or more races. Hispanic or Latino of any race were 0.2% of the population.

There were 356 households, of which 27.2% had children under the age of 18 living with them, 55.3% were married couples living together, 7.3% had a female householder with no husband present, 3.4% had a male householder with no wife present, and 34.0% were non-families. 29.5% of all households were made up of individuals, and 17.2% had someone living alone who was 65 years of age or older. The average household size was 2.26 and the average family size was 2.79.

The median age in the city was 45.4 years. 19.7% of residents were under the age of 18; 7.1% were between the ages of 18 and 24; 22.7% were from 25 to 44; 28.4% were from 45 to 64; and 21.9% were 65 years of age or older. The gender makeup of the city was 48.5% male and 51.5% female.

2000 census
As of the census of 2000, there were 935 people, 348 households, and 243 families living in the city. The population density was 931.0 people per square mile (361.0/km). There were 395 housing units at an average density of 393.3 per square mile (152.5/km). The racial makeup of the city was 98.40% White, 0.53% Native American, 0.11% Asian, 0.11% Pacific Islander, and 0.86% from two or more races. Hispanic or Latino of any race were 0.11% of the population.

There were 348 households, out of which 34.8% had children under the age of 18 living with them, 58.6% were married couples living together, 7.8% had a female householder with no husband present, and 29.9% were non-families. 27.3% of all households were made up of individuals, and 16.1% had someone living alone who was 65 years of age or older. The average household size was 2.52 and the average family size was 3.08.

In the city, the population was spread out, with 26.4% under the age of 18, 6.5% from 18 to 24, 26.3% from 25 to 44, 18.6% from 45 to 64, and 22.1% who were 65 years of age or older. The median age was 38 years. For every 100 females, there were 88.1 males. For every 100 females age 18 and over, there were 80.6 males.

The median income for a household in the city was $34,250, and the median income for a family was $41,932. Males had a median income of $33,750 versus $18,417 for females. The per capita income for the city was $15,441. About 5.3% of families and 7.5% of the population were below the poverty line, including 6.1% of those under age 18 and 7.1% of those age 65 or over.

Education
The 1928 Oregon boys' basketball, which featured future University of Missouri coach Wilbur Stalcup, won the state basketball tournament at a time when Missouri did not have divisions for its schools. The team reached the quarterfinals of the National Interscholastic Basketball Tournament to determine a national champion. At the time, Oregon did not have a gymnasium.  Oregon's team consisted of a total of 10 players. It practiced on an outdoor court and occasionally inside the Methodist Church.

The Holt County Museum & Research Center is located in Oregon, Missouri.

Oregon has a lending library, the Oregon Public Library.

Notable people
 Edward Coke Crow, former United States Democratic Attorney General
 Wilbur Stalcup, former University of Missouri basketball head coach

See also
 Nave & McCord Mercantile Company

References

External links
 Historic maps of the area in the 'Sanborn Maps of Missouri' Collection at the University of Missouri
 Oregon, Missouri (City Data.com)
 Holt County (website)

Cities in Holt County, Missouri
County seats in Missouri
Cities in Missouri